is an anime television series produced by Sunrise. Directed by Tetsurō Amino and featuring mecha designs by Kunio Okawara, it premiered on TV Tokyo on April 6, 1993, and ended its run on March 29, 1994, spanning a total of 52 episodes. An original video animation (OVA) titled  was released between November 21, 1994, and April 25, 1995.

Characters

Iron Leaguers
 Baseball Leaguer. Voiced by Yasunori Matsumoto.
 Soccer Leaguer. Voiced by Ryōtarō Okiayu.
 Karate Leaguer. Voiced by Ryo Horikawa.
 Football Leaguer. Voiced by Chafurin.
 Kendo Leaguer. Voiced by Kappei Yamaguchi.
 Basketball Leaguer. Voiced by Jūrōta Kosugi.
 Hockey Leaguer. Voiced by Yukitoshi Hori.

Gold Brothers
Gold Arm - Baseball Leaguer. Voiced by Yanada Kiyoyuki.
Gold Foot - Soccer Leaguer. Voiced by Fumihiko Tachiki.
Gold Mask - Baseball Leaguer. Voiced by Shinichiro Ohta.

Humans

 Coach Eddie Ginjō
 Ricardo Ginjō

Music
Opening Theme  by Atsuo Tanimoto
Ending Theme
 "Dreamy Planets" by Chisa Yokoyama (eps 1-26)
  by Yasunori Matsumoto and Ryotaro Okiayu (eps 27–51)
  by Atsuo Tanimoto (ep 52)
Original Soundtrack by Kaoru Wada
Special Theme from the MBA/MetroBall on March 7, 1998  by Louie Heredia

Video games
A single video game based on Shippū! Iron Leaguer was released in Japan for Game Boy on March 11, 1994. Characters from the series appear in the game Super Robot Wars NEO for the Nintendo Wii.

References

External links
Sunrise's official TV show website 
Sunrise's official OVA website 

1994 video games
Anime with original screenplays
Fictional sports in anime and manga
Sunrise (company)
Bandai Namco franchises
Super robot anime and manga
TV Tokyo original programming